Kuladhar is a given name of Indian origin. Notable people with the name include:

Kuladhar Chaliha (1887–1963), Indian politician
Kuladhar Saikia (born 1959), Indian police officer

Indian given names